The Portrait of Pierre Seriziat (or Sériziat) is a 1795 oil canvas portrait by French artist Jacques Louis David. The portrait shows an elegant and wealthy Frenchman, Pierre Seriziat, seated outdoors on top of a rock. The painting is one of a pair done by David for Seriziat and his wife Emilie, the sister of David's then-estranged wife Charlotte. The companion piece, Portrait of Emilie Seriziat, shows a woman in a white dress indoors, holding flowers in one hand and the hand of a child in the other. Both paintings are held in the Louvre in Paris.

References

Brookner, Anita, Jacques-Louis David, London: Chatto &Windus, 1980; New York, 
N.Y.: Thames and Hudson, 1980, 1987.

“Jacques-Louis David.” Encyclopædia Britannica. Encyclopædia Britannica Online 
Academic Edition. Encyclopædia Britannica Inc., 2015. Web. 24 Apr. 2014.

"Portrait of Pierre Seriziat (1757-1847) Jacques Louis-David" Www.Art.com. Art.com Inc., n.d. Web.

Paintings in the Louvre by French artists
Seriziat, Pierre
1795 paintings